Robert Lindsay may refer to:

Politics and law
 Robert Lindsay (Tyrone MP) (1679–1743), Irish barrister, politician and judge
 Robert Lindsay (North Carolina politician) (c. 1735–1801), American politician, North Carolina General Assembly
 Robert Lindsay (colonial official) (1754–1836), Scottish colonial official
 Robert B. Lindsay (1824–1902), Scottish-American politician, governor of Alabama
 Robert Lindsay (New York politician) (1895/96–1972), American politician from Staten Island
 Robert Lindsay (Australian politician) (1905–2000), Australian politician
 Robert D. Lindsay (1919–1999), Canadian politician
 Robert Lindsay, 29th Earl of Crawford (1927–2023), Scottish politician

Sports
 Frog Lindsay (Robert Alexander Lindsay, 1885–1964), American baseball player
 Robert Lindsay-Watson (1886–1956), Scottish rugby union player
 Robert Lindsay (athlete) (1890–1958), British Olympic track and field athlete

Others
 Robert de Lindsay (fl. 1100s), Scottish noble
 Robert Lindsay of Pitscottie (ca. 1532–1580), Scottish chronicler
 Robert Henry Lindsay (1868–1938), Canadian painter
 Robert Opie Lindsay (1894–1952), American World War II flying ace
 Robert Bruce Lindsay (1900–1985), American physicist
 Robert Lindsay (actor) (born 1949), English actor

See also
Robert Lindsey (disambiguation)
Robert Linzee (1739–1804), officer of the Royal Navy
Robin Lindsay (Frederick Robert Lindsay, 1914–2011), British field hockey player